Eupithecia cretata is a moth in the family Geometridae first described by George Duryea Hulst in 1896. It is found in the US state of Colorado.

The forewings are pale. There is a broad, smoky brown terminal band on both wings.

References

Moths described in 1896
cretata
Moths of North America